Babacar M'Baye Gueye (born 2 March 1986) is a Senegalese former professional footballer who played as a forward. At international level, he represented the Senegal national team.

Club career
Born in Dakar, Gueye began his career with Génération Foot and joined FC Metz in 2002. On 27 January 2009, the Senegalese striker was loaned to CS Sedan where he remained until June 2009. On 23 July 2009, he signed a four-year contract with German club Alemannia Aachen for a transfer fee of €500,000. During the summer break, he agreed to a one-year loan spell at FSV Frankfurt. Gueye made his first game for his new club on the season opener at home against Union Berlin, on 15 July 2011. He failed to score from the penalty spot in the dying seconds of injury time, thus the game ended in a 1–1 draw.

Gueye transferred to China League One club Shenzhen Ruby on 28 February 2012. He won two successive top scorers of the league between 2012 and 2013.

International career
Gueye was a member of the Senegal national team with 25 appearances and six goals.

Personal life
His younger brother is ex-Metz midfielder Ibrahima Gueye who now plays for CS Louhans-Cuiseaux and his cousin is Momar N'Diaye, who also played for Metz.

Career statistics

References

External links
 
 
 
 

1986 births
Living people
Footballers from Dakar
French sportspeople of Senegalese descent
Senegalese footballers
Association football forwards
Senegal international footballers
2008 Africa Cup of Nations players
China League One players
Liga I players
2. Bundesliga players
Ligue 1 players
Ligue 2 players
FC Metz players
Alemannia Aachen players
FSV Frankfurt players
Shenzhen F.C. players
Xinjiang Tianshan Leopard F.C. players
Heilongjiang Ice City F.C. players
Inner Mongolia Zhongyou F.C. players
Senegalese expatriate footballers
Senegalese expatriate sportspeople in Romania
Expatriate footballers in Romania
Senegalese expatriate sportspeople in Germany
Expatriate footballers in Germany
Senegalese expatriate sportspeople in China
Expatriate footballers in China